The 1979 Argentina rugby union tour of New Zealand was a series of nine matches played by the Argentina national rugby union team in August and September 1979.

Matches

 Poverty Bay: G.Muir G.Bárbara, L.Bárbara, W.Isaac, K.Me.Pherson; J.Whittle, P.Duncan; S.Spence, P.Tocker, Newlands; T.Arthur, W.Muir; W.Mc Farlane, G.Allen, R.Newlands Argentina: M.Sansot; P.Campo, M.Loffreda, R.Madero, A.Cappelletti; H.Porta (capt.), A.Soares Gache; H.Silva, T.Petersen, G.Travaglini; A.Iachetti, M.Iachetti; H.Nicola,J.Pérez Coba, E.Rodríguez 

Auckland: C.Farrell; B.Williams, G.Cunningham, T.Twigden, M.Milla; P.Richards, R.Dunn, S.Vaout'ua, K.Ramsay, M.Trapp; A.Haden, J.Al len; E.Johstone (capt.), K.Boyle, L.Toki. 
Argentina M.Sansot; M.Campo, M .Loffreda, R.Madero, A.Cappelletti; Porta (capt.), A.Soares Gache; H, Silva, T.Petersen, G.Travaglini; A.Iachetti, M.Iachetti; H.Nicola, J.Pérez Coba, E.Rodríguez. 

Manawatu:A.Innes; M.O'Callaghan, A.Tatans, L.Cameron, K.Granber; J.Carroll, M.Donaldson; S.Fleming, T.Sole, G.Old; M.Rosenbrook, M.Shaw; D.Clara, G.Knight, R.Gaskin. Argentina R.Muñiz (41' Gauweloose); M.Campo, M.Loffreda R.Madero, A.Cappelletti; H.Porta (capt.), R.Landajo; E.Ure, T.Petersen, R.Lucke; A.Iachetti, G.Travaglini; H.Nicola, J.Pérez Coba, E.Rodríguez. 

 Bay of Plenty: Rowlands; D.C.Wanoa, K.A, Ngamanu, E.J.Stokes, J.T.Kamizona; L.J.Brake, P.E. Cook; A, M.Mc Naughton, F.K.Shelford, G.W.Elvin; P.M.Chadwick, C.J.Ross; R.J.Moore, H.Reid, M.Shew. 
Argentina M.Sansot (G.D.Cappelletti.); M.Campo, M.Loffreda, R.Madero, J.H.Gauweloose, H.Porta
(capt.), R.Landajo; R.Mastei, A.Silva, G.Travaglini; A.Iachetti, M.Iachetti; A.Voltán, A.Cubelli, E.Rodríguez.  

Taranaki: Davidson, B.Gould; M.Thomson, M, Watts, P.Wharehoka; P.Martin, D.Loveridge; E.Fleming, G.Mourie (capt.), C.Cooper, I.Eliason, J.Thwaites; B.Mc Eldowney, F.O' Carroll, J.Mc.Eldouney. Argentina E, Sanguinetti; M.Campo, R.Madero, M.Loffreda, A.Cappelletti ; H.Porta (capt.), A.Soares Gache; T, Petersen t:.Ure, R.Lucke; A.Iachetti, G.Travaglini; H.Nicola, J,Pérez Cobo, F, Morel. 

 South Canterbury: T. Kelly; N. Richards, R. Heron, G. O'Brien, R. Teahen; L. Jaffray, K. Tarrant; N. Glass, H. King, D. Callan; U. Bell, M. Kerse; J. Cleverley, T. Murphy, M. Lindsay Argentina M. Sansot; M. Campo, R. Madero, J. P. Picardo, J. Gauweloose, H. Porta (capt.), R. Landajo; E. Ure, T. Petersen, R. Lucke; A. Iachetti, G. Travaglini; W. Voltán, A. Cubelli, F. Morel 

 Counties: B.Lendrum; R.Kururangi, P.Reilly, B.Robertson, G.Taylor W.Me lean, M.Codlin; P.
Clatworthy, H.Habraken, A.Dawson, J.Rawiri, G.Spiers; R.Ketels, A.Daltan (capt.), J.Hughes. Argentina M.Sansot; M.Campo, M.Loffreda, R.Madero, A.Cappelletti H.Porta (capt.), R.Landajo; E.Use, T.Petersen, G.Travaglini; A.Iachetti, M.Iachetti; A.Voltán, A.Cuballi, E.Rodríguez.

References

Sources

1979
1979
1979 in New Zealand rugby union
1979 in Argentine rugby union